Jason Donnelly (born 24 April 1987) is a New Zealand cricketer. He played in eleven first-class matches for Canterbury and Northern Districts from 2009 to 2012.

References

External links
 

1987 births
Living people
New Zealand cricketers
Canterbury cricketers
Northern Districts cricketers
Cricketers from Auckland